Ed Lacy (August 25, 1911 - January 7, 1968), born Leonard S. Zinberg, was an American writer of crime and detective fiction. Lacy, who was Jewish American, is credited with creating "the first credible African American PI" character in fiction, Toussaint "Touie" Marcus Moore. Room to Swing, his 1957 novel that introduced Touie Moore, received the 1958 Edgar Award for Best Novel.

Biography
Lacy was born in New York City. He was a member of the League of American writers, and served on its Keep America Out of War Committee in January 1940 during the period of the Molotov–Ribbentrop Pact. He died of a heart attack in Harlem in 1968, at the age of 56.

Bibliography 
Walk Hard, Talk Loud (1940) The Woman Aroused (1951)Sin in Their Blood (1952)Strip for Violence (1953)Enter Without Desire (1954)Go for the Body (1954)The Best That Ever Did It (also issued as Visa to Death) (1955)The Men from the Boys (1956)Lead with Your Left (1957)Room to Swing (1957)Breathe No More, My Lady (1958)Shakedown for Murder (1958)Be Careful How You Live (1959)Blonde Bait (1959)The Big Fix (1960)A Deadly Affair (1960)Bugged for Murder (1961)The Freeloaders (1961)South Pacific Affair (1961)The Sex Castle (also issued as Shoot It Again) (1963)Two Hot to Handle (two novellas: The Coin of Adventure and Murder in Paradise) (1963)Moment of Untruth (1964)Harlem Underground (1965)Pity the Honest (1965)The Hotel Dwellers (1966)Double Trouble (1967)In Black & Whitey (1967)The Napalm Bugle (1968)The Big Bust'' (1969)

References

1911 births
1968 deaths
20th-century American novelists
American male novelists
American mystery writers
Edgar Award winners
Writers from New York City
Jewish American novelists
American male short story writers
20th-century American short story writers
20th-century American male writers
Novelists from New York (state)
20th-century American Jews